Abdul Majid (born 7 September 1993) is a Pakistani cricketer who played List A cricket for Pakistan Television, Islamabad and T20Is for Bahrain national cricket team.

References

External links
 

1993 births
Living people
Pakistani cricketers
Islamabad cricketers
Pakistan Television cricketers
Cricketers from Islamabad